Hackney Central was a borough constituency in what was then the Metropolitan Borough of Hackney, in London.  It returned one Member of Parliament (MP)  to the House of Commons of the Parliament of the United Kingdom.

The constituency was created under the Redistribution of Seats Act, 1885 from 1885, and abolished for the 1950 general election.  It was recreated for the 1955 general election, and abolished again for the 1983 general election.

Boundaries
1885–1918: The wards of Dalston and De Beauvoir Town, and part of Hackney ward.

1918–1950: The Metropolitan Borough of Hackney wards of Downs, Hackney, and Kingsland, and part of West Hackney ward.

1955–1974: The Metropolitan Borough of Hackney wards of Albion, Chatham, Kenninghall, Kingsland, Kingsmead, Leabridge, Pembury, Rushmore, and Town Hall.

1974–1983: The London Borough of Hackney wards of Chatham, Downs, Kingsmead, Leabridge, Rectory, and Wick.

Members of Parliament

MPs 1885-1950

MPs 1955-1983

Election results

Elections in the 1880s

Elections in the 1890s

Elections in the 1900s

Elections in the 1910s

Elections in the 1920s

Elections in the 1930s 

General Election 1939–40

Another General Election was required to take place before the end of 1940. The political parties had been making preparations for an election to take place from 1939 and by the end of this year, the following candidates had been selected; 
Labour: Fred Watkins 
Conservative: William Arthur Fearnley-Whittingstall

Elections in the 1940s

Elections in the 1950s

Elections in the 1960s

Elections in the 1970s

References 

 
 British Parliamentary Election Results 1885-1918, compiled and edited by F.W.S. Craig (Macmillan Press 1974)
 Craig, F. W. S. (1983). British parliamentary election results 1918-1949 (3 ed.). Chichester: Parliamentary Research Services. .
 Debrett’s Illustrated Heraldic and Biographical House of Commons and the Judicial Bench 1886
 Debrett’s House of Commons and the Judicial Bench 1901
 Debrett’s House of Commons and the Judicial Bench 1918

Parliamentary constituencies in London (historic)
Constituencies of the Parliament of the United Kingdom established in 1885
Constituencies of the Parliament of the United Kingdom disestablished in 1950
Constituencies of the Parliament of the United Kingdom established in 1955
Constituencies of the Parliament of the United Kingdom disestablished in 1983
Parliamentary constituencies in the London Borough of Hackney